José Antonio Gómez Rosas (1916–1977) was a Mexican painter.

1916 births
1977 deaths
Muralists
20th-century Mexican painters
20th-century Mexican male artists
Mexican male painters